Octave Chanute  (February 18, 1832  – November 23, 1910) was a French-American civil engineer and aviation pioneer. He advised and publicized many aviation enthusiasts, including the Wright brothers. At his death, he was hailed as the father of aviation and the initial concepts of the heavier-than-air flying machine.

Early life
Octave Chanut was born in Paris to Elise and Joseph Chanut, professor at the Collège de France. Octave and Joseph emigrated to the United States of America in 1838, when Joseph was named Vice President of Jefferson College in Louisiana. Octave attended private schools in New York. He added the "e" to his last name in his adult life.

Career

Railroad civil engineer

Chanute began his training as a civil engineer in 1848.

He was widely considered brilliant and innovative in the engineering profession. During his career he designed and constructed the two biggest stockyards in the United States, Chicago Stock Yards (1865) and Kansas City Stockyards (1871). He designed and built the Hannibal Bridge with Joseph Tomlinson and George S. Morison. In 1869, this bridge established Kansas City, Missouri as the dominant city in the region, as the first bridge to cross the Missouri River there. He designed many other bridges during his railroad career, including the Illinois River rail bridge at Chillicothe, Illinois, the Genesee River Gorge rail bridge near Portageville, New York (now in Letchworth State Park), the Sibley Railroad Bridge across the Missouri River at Sibley, Missouri, the Fort Madison Toll Bridge at Fort Madison, Iowa, and the Kinzua Bridge in Pennsylvania.

Pioneer in wood preservation
Chanute established a procedure for pressure-treating wooden railroad ties with an antiseptic that increased the wood's lifespan in the tracks. Establishing the first commercial plants, he convinced railroad men that it was commercially feasible to make money by spending money on treating ties to extend their service time and reduce replacement costs. As a method to monitor the longevity of railroad ties and other wooden structures, he introduced the railroad date nail in the United States.

Chanute retired from the Erie Railway in 1883 to become an independent engineering consultant.

Aviation pioneer 

Chanute became interested in aviation after watching a balloon ascend in Peoria, Illinois, in 1856. When he retired from his railroad career in 1883, he devoted some leisure time to furthering the new science of aviation. Applying his engineering background, Chanute collected all available data from flight experimenters around the world and combined it with the knowledge gathered as a civil engineer in the past. He published his findings in a series of articles in The Railroad and Engineering Journal from 1891 to 1893, which were then re-published in the influential book Progress in Flying Machines in 1894. This was the most systematic global survey of fixed-wing heavier-than-air aviation research published up to that time.

At the World's Columbian Exposition in Chicago in 1893, Chanute collaborated with Albert Zahm to organize a highly successful International Conference on Aerial Navigation.

Chanute was too old to fly, so he partnered with younger experimenters, including Augustus M. Herring and William Avery. In 1896, Chanute, Herring, and Avery tested a design based on the work of German aviation pioneer Otto Lilienthal, and of hang gliders of their own design. The testing was in the dunes along the shore of Lake Michigan near the town of Miller Beach, Indiana, just east of what became the city of Gary. These experiments convinced Chanute that the best way to achieve extra lift without a prohibitive increase in weight was to stack several wings, an idea proposed by the British engineer Francis Herbert Wenham in 1866 and realized in flight by Lilienthal in the 1890s. Chanute introduced the "strut-wire" braced wing structure that was used in powered biplanes of the future, not seriously challenged until the pioneering efforts of Hugo Junkers to develop all-metal cantilever airframe technology without external bracing from 1915 onward. Chanute based his "interplane strut" concept on the Pratt truss, which was familiar to him from his bridge-building work. The Wright brothers based their glider designs on the Chanute "double-decker", as they called it. A new design of a biplane glider was developed and flown in 1897.

Chanute corresponded with many aviation pioneers, including Otto Lilienthal, Louis Pierre Mouillard, Gabriel Voisin, John J. Montgomery, Louis Blériot, Ferdinand Ferber, Lawrence Hargrave, and Alberto Santos Dumont. In 1897, he started a correspondence with British aviator Percy Pilcher. Following Chanute's ideas, Pilcher built a triplane, but he was killed in a glider crash in October 1899 before he could attempt to fly it.

In 1900, Wilbur Wright read Progress in Flying Machines and contacted Chanute. Chanute helped to publicize the Wright brothers' work and provided consistent encouragement, visiting their camp near Kitty Hawk, North Carolina, in 1901, 1902, and 1903. The Wrights and Chanute exchanged hundreds of letters between 1900 and 1910.

Chanute freely shared his knowledge about aviation with anyone who was interested, and expected others to do the same. He encouraged colleagues to patent their inventions. His open approach led to friction with the Wright brothers, who believed their ideas about aircraft control were unique and refused to share them. Chanute did not believe that the Wright flying machine patent, premised on wing warping, could be enforced and said so publicly, including a newspaper interview in which he said, "I admire the Wrights. I feel friendly toward them for the marvels they have achieved, but you can easily gauge how I feel concerning their attitude at present by the remark I made to Wilbur Wright recently. I told him I was sorry to see they were suing other experimenters and abstaining from entering the contests and competitions in which other men are brilliantly winning laurels. I told him that in my opinion they are wasting valuable time over lawsuits which they ought to concentrate in their work. Personally, I do not think that the courts will hold that the principle underlying the warping tips can be patented." The friendship was still impaired when Chanute died, but Wilbur Wright attended Chanute's memorial service at the family's home. Wright wrote a eulogy that was read at the Aero Club meeting in January 1911.

When the Aero Club of Illinois was founded on February 10, 1910, Chanute was its first president until his death.

Death

Chanute died on November 23, 1910, in Chicago.

Commemoration
The town of Chanute, Kansas, is named after Chanute. Three small towns in southeast Kansas were vying for the railroad's land office and Chanute suggested that they incorporate, to make the larger town more attractive to the railroad. The former Chanute Air Force Base near Rantoul, Illinois, was decommissioned in 1993. The former base, now turned to peacetime endeavors, included the now closed Octave Chanute Aerospace Museum, which detailed the history of aviation and of Chanute Air Force Base.

In 1902, the Western Society of Engineers began to present the Octave Chanute Award for papers of merit on engineering innovations. From 1939 to 2005, the American Institute of Aeronautics and Astronautics presented the Chanute Flight Award for an outstanding contribution made by a pilot or test personnel to the advancement of the art, science, and technology of aeronautics.

In 1963, Chanute was inducted into the National Aviation Hall of Fame in Dayton, Ohio.

In 1974, Chanute was inducted into the International Air & Space Hall of Fame.

In 1978, the U.S. Postal Service commemorated Octave Chanute with a pair of 21-cent airmail stamps.

In 1996, the National Soaring Museum honored the 100th anniversary of the glider flying experiments in the sand dunes along Lake Michigan as National Landmark of Soaring No. 8.

Embry-Riddle Aeronautical University, Daytona Beach, in Daytona Beach, Florida, has an off-campus residence hall, the Chanute Complex. for upper-class students.

The Gary Bathing Beach Aquatorium, in Gary, Indiana, houses a museum dedicated to both Octave Chanute and the Tuskegee Airmen. The historic bathing pavilion was designed by architect George Washington Maher.

He is represented in the Frieze of American History, in the Capitol Rotunda in Washington DC.

Patents

U.S. patents
 , Rolling Track Irons
 , Dredging Machine (Octave Chanute & George S. Morrison)
 , Preserving timber structure
 , Soaring Machine
 , Means for Aerial Flight, Chanute filed the patent on behalf of Louis Mouillard, with one-half being assigned to Chanute.
 , Soaring Machine, William Paul Butusov, Chanute collaborated and paid for the patent process and was assigned one-half.
 , Process of Preserving Wood
 , Means for Aerial Flight (or glider launcher).

U.K. patents
 13372 (flying machine, c.1897)
 13373 (flying machine, c.1897)
 15221 (flying machine, c.1897)

Canadian patents
 {34507}, Process of Preserving Wood Artificially against Decay

Timeline

See also 
 Octave Chanute Award
 The "Pioneer Era" (1900–1914) of Aviation history

References

Bibliography
 Text of Progress in Flying Machines
 Progress in Flying Machines By Octave Chanute, Courier Dover Publications, reprint 1997 of 1894 original. At Google books.
 World Book Encyclopedia
 Octave Chanute, 1832-1910. Obituary in Flight. 3 December 1910
 Simine Short.  2011.  Locomotive to Aeromotive: Octave Chanute and the Transportation Revolution. University of Illinois Press.

External links

 
 
 Progress in Flying Machines
 (Fiddlersgreen.net) history, photos, paper model
 A comprehensive look at Chanute's glider flying experiments in 1896 in northern Indiana
 Flights Before the Wrights, Octave Chanute: aeronautical pioneer, engineer and teacher
 
 Locomotive to Aeromotive

 
1832 births
1910 deaths
Engineers from New York City
Gliding in the United States
Aerodynamicists
Wright brothers
Aviation pioneers
Aviation inventors
Royal Aeronautical Society Gold Medal winners
American railway civil engineers
French emigrants to the United States
Burials in Illinois
Articles which contain graphical timelines